USA-226 is the first flight of the second Boeing X-37B, the Orbital Test Vehicle 2 (X-37B OTV-2), an American unmanned robotic vertical-takeoff, horizontal-landing spaceplane. It was launched aboard an Atlas V rocket from Cape Canaveral on 5 March 2011, and landed at Vandenberg Air Force Base on 16 June 2012. It operated in low Earth orbit. Its mission designation is part of the USA series.

The spaceplane was operated by Air Force Space Command, which has not revealed the specific identity of the payload for the first flight.  The Air Force stated only that the spacecraft would "demonstrate various experiments and allow satellite sensors, subsystems, components, and associated technology to be transported into space and back."

Launch
OTV-2 was launched aboard an Atlas V rocket, tail number AV-026, on 5 March 2011 from Space Launch Complex 41 at Cape Canaveral Air Force Station in Florida. It was scheduled to launch on the previous day, 4 March, but weather prevented the launch on that day, forcing the reschedule to 5 March.

The launch was conducted by United Launch Alliance.

The X-37B spacecraft was originally intended to be deployed from the payload bay of a NASA Space Shuttle, but following the Columbia accident, it was transferred to a Delta II 7920, then subsequently transferred to the Atlas V following concerns over the X-37B's aerodynamic properties during launch.

Prior to the installation of the spacecraft, the Atlas rocket was moved to the launch pad and performed a wet dress rehearsal on 4 February 2011. It was returned to the Vertical Integration Facility the following day for final assembly.

Mission
Most of the mission parameters for the first OTV-2 flight have not been disclosed. The Air Force stated the mission time would depend on progress of the craft's experiments during orbit. On 29 November 2011 a spokesperson for the Secretary of the Air Force announced the mission was extended beyond its original life expectancy, citing ongoing experimentation.

In addition to its unspecified payload, OTV-2 carried a folded solar panel in its cargo bay to power the spacecraft during its year and a half long mission.

Altitude and ground track resonance history

Landing
After completing its mission, OTV-2 deorbited, entered the atmosphere, and landed at Vandenberg Air Force Base on 16 June 2012 at 05:48 PT (12:48 GMT). OTV-2 is the third reusable spaceplane to perform an automated landing after returning from orbit, the first being the Soviet Buran spacecraft in 1988 and the second, its sister craft, the OTV-1.

See also

2011 in spaceflight
Lockheed Martin X-33
USA-212

References

External links
Video of the landing of USA-226

Spacecraft launched in 2011
DARPA
Satellites of the United States Air Force
Spacecraft which reentered in 2012
USA satellites
Articles containing video clips
Boeing X-37